The Supreme Court of the United States handed down nine per curiam opinions during its 2008 term, which began on October 6, 2008 and concluded October 4, 2009.

Because per curiam decisions are issued from the Court as an institution, these opinions all lack the attribution of authorship or joining votes to specific justices. All justices on the Court at the time the decision was handed down are assumed to have participated and concurred unless otherwise noted.

Court membership

Chief Justice: John Roberts

Associate Justices: John Paul Stevens, Antonin Scalia, Anthony Kennedy, David Souter, Clarence Thomas, Ruth Bader Ginsburg, Stephen Breyer, Samuel Alito

Moore v. United States

Brunner v. Ohio Republican Party

Hedgpeth v. Pulido

Spears v. United States

Nelson v. United States

CSX Transp., Inc. v. Hensley

Indiana State Police Pension Trust v. Chrysler LLC

See also 
 List of United States Supreme Court cases, volume 555
 List of United States Supreme Court cases, volume 556

Notes

References

 

United States Supreme Court per curiam opinions
Lists of 2008 term United States Supreme Court opinions
2008 per curiam